John Doyle Ong (born September 29, 1933, Ohio) is an American business executive. He served as United States Ambassador to Norway from 2002 to 2005.

He graduated from Ohio State University with a bachelor's and master's degree before studying law at Harvard University. Since then, Ong has also received honorary doctorates from Ohio State University, Kent State University, the University of Akron, and South Dakota State University. A longtime employee of the B. F. Goodrich Company, Ong served as chairman and chief executive officer of the company from 1979 to 1996. In 1984, President Reagan appointed Ong to the President’s Commission on Industrial Competitiveness, where he served as Co-Chair of its International Trade Committee. He retired in 1997 as chairman of the board of directors.  Ong is a trustee emeritus at Western Reserve Academy where the John D. Ong Library is named in his honor.

Ong has played a leadership role in a number of key organizations involved with education and business. He is a life Trustee of the University of Chicago and is a Trustee of Ohio State University, the Musical Arts Association of Cleveland, Ohio (Cleveland Orchestra), the Fort Ligonier Association and a Trustee Emeritus of Western Reserve Academy in Hudson, Ohio. Ong is a leading advocate for business involvement in civic and cultural activities, both nationally and in northeast Ohio. He is a former Chairman of the Business Roundtable, the National Alliance of Business, the Business Committee for the Arts, New American Schools, Inc., and the Ohio Business Roundtable. He was a member of The Business Council from 1989 until 2005. He is now a member of the Council of Retired Chief Executives and the Council of American Ambassadors. He has served as a Director of seven S&P 500 companies.

At the end of his ambassadorship in November 2005, Ong was given the Grand Cross of the Royal Norwegian Order of Merit.

References

External links
Profile, US Embassy, Norway
Office of the Historian

1933 births
Living people
Ambassadors of the United States to Norway
American business executives
Businesspeople from Ohio
Harvard Law School alumni
Ohio State University alumni